Valle may refer to:

 Valle (surname)

Geography
"Valle", the cultural and climatic zone of the dry subtropical Interandean Valles of the Andes of Peru, Bolivia, and northwest Argentina
University of Valle, a public university in Cali, Colombia
Bale, Croatia, or Valle, a small town and municipality in Istria county, Croatia
Valle, Ecuador, a town and parish in Cuenca Canton, Azuay Province, Ecuador
Valle Department, a department in southern Honduras
Valle di Cadore, a municipality Belluno, Veneto, Italy
Valle Parish, an administrative unit of Aizkraukle District, Latvia
Valle Hundred, a hundred of Västergötland county, Sweden
Valle, Arizona, United States

Norway
Valle, or Valle-Hovin, a neighborhood in the capital city of Oslo
Valle, Bamble, a village in the municipality of Bamble in Vestfold og Telemark county; see Stråholmen
Valle, Møre og Romsdal, a village in the municipality of Ålesund in Møre og Romsdal county
Valle, Norway, a municipality in the Setesdal valley in Agder county
Valle (village), a village in the Setesdal valley in Agder county
Valle Church (Valle), a church in the municipality of Valle in Agder county
Valle Church (Lindesnes), a church in the municipality of Lindesnes in Agder county

Other
 Valle's Steak House, an American restaurant
 Valle 1 and Valle 2, thermosolar plants in San José del Valle, Spain
 Valle, the SkiStar company mascot

See also
 Vallé, a surname
 El Valle (disambiguation)
 Della Valle (disambiguation)
 Del Valle (disambiguation)
 
 Vale (disambiguation)
 Vallée, a surname
 Vallejo (disambiguation)
 Vallely, a surname
 Vallen, a surname
 Valles (disambiguation)
 Valletta (disambiguation)
 Valley (disambiguation)